The marathon at the Summer Olympics is the only road running event held at the multi-sport event. The men's marathon has been present on the Olympic athletics programme since 1896. Nearly ninety years later, the women's event was added to the programme at the 1984 Olympics in Los Angeles.

History
The modern marathon event was created and later refined through the Olympic competition. The idea of holding a marathon race at the first Olympics was suggested to Pierre de Coubertin by Michel Bréal. On April 10, 1896, Greek water-carrier Spyridon Louis won the first Olympic marathon in 2 hours 58 minutes and 50 seconds. The route between Marathon and Panathenaic Stadium was repeated when Athens hosted the 2004 Games.

The 1908 London Olympics marked the introduction of the now standard distance of 26 miles, 385 yards (42.195 km). However, it was not until the 1924 Paris Olympics that this distance became the standard at the Olympics.

The Olympic marathon proved immediately popular in the Western world and quickly spawned numerous long-running annual races, including the Boston Marathon in 1897, the Tour de Paris Marathon in 1902, the Yonkers Marathon in 1907, and the London Polytechnic Marathon in 1909. Such marathons played a key role in the expansion of the road running movement internationally over the course of the 20th century.

It has become a tradition for the men's Olympic marathon to be the last event of the athletics calendar, on the final day of the Olympics. For many years since the 1964 Tokyo Games, the race finished inside the Olympic stadium; however, at the 2004 Athens games, the finish was at the historic Panathenaic Stadium, at the 2012 London games, the start and finish were on The Mall, and at the 2016 Rio games, the start and finish were in the Sambadrome Marquês de Sapucaí, the parade area that serves as a spectator mall for Carnival.  At the 2020 Tokyo games, the marathon was instead held in Sapporo due to heat concerns in the host city. Often, the men's marathon medals are awarded at the closing ceremony. In 2020, both the men's and women's medals were presented.

The Olympic records for the event are 2:06:32 hours for men, set by Samuel Wanjiru in 2008, and 2:23:07 hours for women, set by Tiki Gelana in 2012. The men's marathon world record has been improved several times at the Olympics: in 1908, 1920, and then at successive Olympics by Abebe Bikila in 1960 and 1964. Abebe Bikila, Waldemar Cierpinski, and Eliud Kipchoge are the only athletes to have won two Olympic gold medals in the marathon. No athlete has won more than two medals of any colour. Ethiopia have won the most gold medals in the event, with six, while Kenya has the greatest medal total with fifteen overall.

Medal summary

Men

Multiple medalists

Medals by country

Women

Multiple medalists

Medals by country

Intercalated Games
The 1906 Intercalated Games were held in Athens and at the time were officially recognised as part of the Olympic Games series, with the intention being to hold a games in Greece in two-year intervals between the internationally held Olympics. However, this plan never came to fruition and the International Olympic Committee (IOC) later decided not to recognise these games as part of the official Olympic series. Some sports historians continue to treat the results of these games as part of the Olympic canon.

At this event a men's marathon was held over 41.86 km and Canada's Billy Sherring won the competition. John Svanberg, the runner-up in the 1906 5-mile race, was also runner-up in the marathon. American William Frank was the bronze medalist.

References
Participation and athlete data
Martin, David and Roger Glynn. 2000. The Olympic Marathon: The History and Drama of Sport's Most Challenging Event. Human Kinetics; Champaign, Illinois.
Athletics Men's Marathon Medalists. Sports Reference. Retrieved on 2014-03-12.
Athletics Women's Marathon Medalists. Sports Reference. Retrieved on 2014-03-12.
Olympic record progressions
Mallon, Bill (2012). TRACK & FIELD ATHLETICS - OLYMPIC RECORD PROGRESSIONS. Track and Field News. Retrieved on 2014-03-12.
Specific

External links
IAAF marathon homepage
Official Olympics website
Olympic athletics records from Track & Field News

 
Olympics
Marathons
Olympics